Exosquad is an American animated television series created by Universal Cartoon Studios for MCA TV's Universal Family Network syndicated programming block as a response to Japanese anime. The show is set in the beginning of the 22nd century and covers the interplanetary war between humanity and Neosapiens, a fictional race artificially created as workers/slaves for the Terrans. The narrative generally follows Able Squad, an elite Terran unit of mecha pilots, on their missions all over the Solar System, although other storylines are also abundant. The series ran for two complete seasons in syndication from 1993 to 1994, and was cancelled after one third-season episode had been produced. Reruns later aired on USA Network.

Series overview

Episodes

Season 1 (1993)

Season 2 (1994)

References

External links
 
 

Exosquad
Exosquad